Mihail Șleahtițchi (born 17 March 1956) is a pedagogue, psychologist, university professor and politician from the Republic of Moldova. Former MP, Secretary and Chairman of the Parliamentary Commission for Culture, Education, Research, Youth, Sports and Mass Media (2009 - 2011), Former Minister of Education of the Republic of Moldova (2011 - 2012), Former Advisor to the President of the Republic of Moldova the fields of culture, education and science (2012-2016).

He has been a member of the Parliament of Moldova since 2009.

He is married to Maria Șleahtițchi.

References

External links 
 Site-ul Parlamentului Republicii Moldova

1956 births
Living people
Moldovan MPs 2009–2010